Telenovel is an English translation of the following words:

 Telenovela, a Latin American serialized television drama
 Telenovela (TV channel), a South Korean cable and satellite specialty channel
 Telenovela Channel, a Philippines cable and satellite specialty channel
 Telenovela (TV series), an American sitcom television series
 Téléroman, a French serialized television drama